"I'm For You" is a song by contemporary Christian singer tobyMac from his third album, Portable Sounds. It was released as a radio single for the album in 2007.

Release
"I'm For You" reached No. 1 on R&R's Christian Hit Radio Chart and stayed for 8 weeks and was the third most-played song on Christian CHR radio stations in 2007. It also reached No. 2 on Billboard'''s Hot Christian Songs chart, and No. 10 on R&R's Christian AC Chart.

Trivia
"I'm For You" was featured in the video game Thrillville: Off the Rails''.

Charts

References

External links
tobyMac's official website

2007 singles
TobyMac songs
Songs written by TobyMac
2007 songs
ForeFront Records singles
Songs written by Cary Barlowe